The 2022–23 season is the 109th in the history of Parma Calcio 1913. The club will participate in Serie B and Coppa Italia.

Players

Others players under contract

Out on loan

Transfers

In

Out

Pre-season and friendlies

Competitions

Overall record

Serie B

League table

Results summary

Results by round

Matches 
The league fixtures were announced on 15 July 2022.

Coppa Italia

References 

Parma Calcio 1913 seasons
Parma